Bella Esperanza (Club Deportivo Bella Esperanza) is a football club, playing in Cerro Azul, Cañete, Lima, Peru, South America.

History
Bella Esperanza was founded on June 25, 1915.

The club participated in the Peruvian Segunda División, and was runner-up in the 1997 season. 

In the 2002 season, the club was relegated to the Copa Perú.

Honors

National
Peruvian Segunda División:
Runner-up (1): 1997

Regional
Liga Departamental de Lima: 
Winners (4): 1983, 1985, 1986, 1987

Liga Provincial de Cañete:
Winners (1): 1983
Runner-up (1): 2010

Liga Distrital de Cerro Azul:
Winners (7): 2010, 2012, 2013, 2015, 2016, 2018, 2019
Runner-up (3): 2011, 2014, 2017

Liga Distrital de San Vicente de Cañete:
Winners (2): 1930, 1983

See also
List of football clubs in Peru
Peruvian football league system

External links
 Peru 2nd Division (Segunda Profesional) Final Tables

Football clubs in Peru
Association football clubs established in 1915